Myosin essential light chain (ELC), ventricular/cardiac isoform is a protein that in humans is encoded by the MYL3 gene. This cardiac ventricular/slow skeletal ELC isoform is distinct from that expressed in fast skeletal muscle (MYL1) and cardiac atrial muscle (MYL4). Ventricular ELC is part of the myosin molecule and is important in modulating cardiac muscle contraction.

Structure
Cardiac, ventricular ELC is 21.9 kDa and composed of 195 amino acids (See human MYL3 sequences features here). Cardiac ELC and the second light chain, regulatory light chain (RLC, MYL2), are non-covalently bound to IQXXXRGXXXR motifs in the 9 nm S1-S2 lever arm of the myosin head, both alpha (MYH6) and beta (MYH7) isoforms. Both light chains are members of the EF-hand superfamily of proteins, which possess helix-loop-helix motifs in two globular domains connected by an alpha-helical linker. Though EF hand motifs are specialized to bind divalent ions such as calcium, cardiac ELC does not bind calcium at physiological levels. The N-terminal region of cardiac ELC is functionally unique in that it is positively charged, being rich in Lysine residues (amino acids 4-14), with subsequent unique structure governed by proline-alanine repeats (amino acids 15-36).

Function 
Studies have provided evidence for ELC as modulator of myosin crossbridge kinetics. Treating cardiac myofibrils with the lysine-rich N-terminal peptide (amino acids 5-14) evoked a supramaximal increase in cardiac myofibrillar MgATPase activity at submaximal calcium concentrations, and further studies demonstrated that this region of ELC modulates the affinity of myosin for actin.

Clinical significance

Mutations in MYL3 have been identified as a cause of familial hypertrophic cardiomyopathy, and associated with a mid-left ventricular chamber type hypertrophy. Five mutations in MYL3 have been identified to date: M149V, R154H, E56G, A57G and E143K. All of these cluster around two of the four EF-hand domains, suggesting that proper conformation in these regions is necessary for normal cardiac function.

References

Further reading

External links 
 Mass spectrometry characterization of MYL3 at COPaKB
  GeneReviews/NIH/NCBI/UW entry on Familial Hypertrophic Cardiomyopathy Overview